Luca Umberto Pompilio (born 16 March 1992) is an Italian footballer.

Biography
Born in Foggia, Apulia region of southern Italy, Pompilio was a player of Lecce, such as a member of the reserve team in 2008–09 season. He also played for Giovanissimi B team in 2006–07 season, despite usually played by under-14 players. Pompilio was signed by third division Varese in January 2010, where he followed the northern Italy club promoted to the second division of Italy. He made his Serie B debut on 9 April 2011 against Grosseto. In January 2012 Pompilio left for Foggia in temporary deal with option to purchase, re-joining teammate Renan Wagner. In June 2012 Varese bought back Pompilio. On 31 August, the last day of transfer windows, he was signed by Pavia in temporary deal. On 31 January 2013 he was signed by Juve Stabia in another co-ownership deal. In June Varese gave up the remain 50% registration rights of Pompilio and Giuseppe Figliomeni to Juve Stabia. On 29 June 2013 Juve Stabia released Pompilio and Marco Gorzegno. With 5 goals only in 7 years his career is probably already ended.

Notes

References

External links
 Lega Serie B profile 

Italian footballers
U.S. Lecce players
S.S.D. Varese Calcio players
Calcio Foggia 1920 players
F.C. Pavia players
S.S. Juve Stabia players
Serie B players
Serie C players
Italy youth international footballers
Association football forwards
Sportspeople from Foggia
1992 births
Living people
Footballers from Apulia